Alexander Adelabu (born 27 September 1999), professionally known as Magixx, is a Nigerian singer and songwriter. In 2021, he was signed to Mavin Records.

Early life and education 
Adelabu was born and brought up in Lagos State. He obtained a degree in Mass Communication from the University of Lagos.

Career 
Magixx began singing in the choir at the age of 10. In September 2021, he was signed to Mavin Records and released his debut self-titled EP Magixx, in that same year.

In February 2022, he released a new version of "Love Don't Cost a Dime" with Ayra Starr, which debuted at 27 on TurnTableTop 50 chart, and peaked at number 8, on 28 March 2022. On 20 July 2022, he released "Shaye" as the lead single from his second EP ATOM. ATOM was released on 22 July 2022, to positive critical response.

Discography

EPs 

 Magixx (2021)
 ATOM (2022)

Selected singles

Awards and nominations

References 

Living people
21st-century Nigerian singers
Nigerian male singers
University of Lagos alumni
Nigerian male singer-songwriters
1999 births